Richard Gasquet and Fabrice Santoro were the defending champions, but chose not to participate that year.

Arnaud Clément and Michaël Llodra won in the final 6–1, 6–4, against Mariusz Fyrstenberg and Marcin Matkowski.

Seeds

Draw

Draw

External links
Draw

Doubles